HMS Duff (K352)  was a British Captain-class frigate of the Royal Navy that served during World War II. Originally constructed as the United States Navy Buckley class destroyer escort USS Lamons (DE-64), she was transferred to the Royal Navy before she was completed.

Construction and transfer
The ship was laid down as the U.S. Navy destroyer escort USS Lamons (DE-64) by Bethlehem-Hingham Shipyard, Inc., in Hingham, Massachusetts, on 22 February 1943 and launched on 22 May 1943. Lamons was transferred to the United Kingdom upon completion on 23 August 1943.

Service history

Commissioned into service in the Royal Navy as the frigate HMS Duff (K352) on 23 August 1943 simultaneously with her transfer, the ship served on patrol and escort duty. At 0745 on 30 November 1944, she struck a mine in the North Sea off Ostend, Belgium, suffering three dead. Although badly damaged, she managed to limp back to port at Harwich, England.

Damaged beyond economical repair, Duff was declared a constructive total loss. The Royal Navy returned her to the U.S. Navy on 28 August 1945.

Disposal
The U.S. Navy struck Duff from its Naval Vessel Register on 17 September 1945. She was sold in May 1947 for scrapping in the Netherlands.

References

Navsource Online: Destroyer Escort Photo Archive Lamons (DE-64) HMS Duff (K-352)
uboat.net HMS Duff (K 352)
Destroyer Escort Sailors Association DEs for UK
Captain Class Frigate Association HMS Duff K352 (DE 64)

 

Captain-class frigates
Buckley-class destroyer escorts
World War II frigates of the United Kingdom
Ships built in Hingham, Massachusetts
1943 ships
Maritime incidents in November 1944